Fatal accidents on the Dundrod Circuit during the Ulster Grand Prix and other motor-sport events.

List of fatal accidents involving competitors

List of fatal accidents involving race officials

List of fatal accidents involving spectators

List of fatal accidents during other events

Sources

See also
North West 200
Ulster Grand Prix
List of Snaefell Mountain Course fatal accidents

Lists of motorsport fatalities
Motorcycle sport lists